Malek Ashtar Garrison ( – Pādegān-e Mālek Ashtar) is a village and military installation in Masumiyeh Rural District, in the Central District of Arak County, Markazi Province, Iran. At the 2006 census, its population was 231, in 64 families. The garrison is named after Malik al-Ashtar and is a recruit training centre for Law Enforcement Force of Islamic Republic of Iran conscripts.

References 

Populated places in Arak County
Recruit training centres of Iranian Police